Guðmundur Hrafnkelsson (born 22 January 1965) is an Icelandic former handball player who competed in the 1988 Summer Olympics, in the 1992 Summer Olympics, and in the 2004 Summer Olympics.

References

1965 births
Living people
Gudmundur Hrafnkelsson
Gudmundur Hrafnkelsson
Handball players at the 1988 Summer Olympics
Handball players at the 1992 Summer Olympics
Handball players at the 2004 Summer Olympics